G39, G-39 or G.39 may refer to:

 Glock 39, a firearm
 SMS G39, an Imperial German Navy torpedo boat